"Our Farewell" is the first single of the Netherlands symphonic metal and rock band Within Temptation from their second studio album Mother Earth. Although the song was released as a single, it never entered the charts, just like their previous single, "Restless". There was also no promotional video made for the single.

A live recording of the song is on the Mother Earth Tour DVD, in which the song is performed as a duet with Dutch opera singer Gea Gijsbertsen, who also conducted the choirs for Within Temptation's special gig at the Broerenkerk, Zwolle during the Mother Earth Tour.

After the release of the album The Silent Force, the song was still played live at some concerts, during the Sanctuary Tour (2012), and during their 15 years birthday live, Elements.

This song has been, among two of Van Canto's songs ("Water, Fire, Heaven, Earth" and "Hearted"), the inspiration for "Forevermore", a song by the Dutch symphonic metal band Epica, featuring the mild-autistic Ruurd Woltring. The recording of this song was made possible thanks to the Dutch TV-show Niks te gek! (Nothing too crazy), in which mentally disabled people get their wishes granted.

Track listing

References 

Within Temptation songs
2001 singles
Songs written by Sharon den Adel
Songs written by Robert Westerholt
Heavy metal ballads
2000 songs
Folk rock songs